Bölme is a belde (town) in the central district of Uşak Province, Turkey. The population of Bölme is 3015  as of 2011. The settlement was founded  about 200 years ago and it was declared a seat of township in 1999. The main economic activity is dairying. Cereal agriculture is another activity.

References

Populated places in Uşak Province
Towns in Turkey
Uşak Central District